Michael Anthony Crisfield (26 July 1942 – 19 February 2002) was a British mathematician and structural analyst who became a leading figure in non-linear computational mechanics. He died of cancer aged 59 in 2002.

Books
 Crisfield, M. A., Finite Elements and Solution Procedures for Structural Analysis, Volume 1: Linear Analysis, Pineridge Press 1986.
 Crisfield, M. A., Non-Linear Finite Element Analysis of Solids and Structures, Volume 1: Essentials, John Wiley & Sons 1991.
 Crisfield, M. A., Non-Linear Finite Element Analysis of Solids and Structures, Volume 2: Advanced Topics, John Wiley & Sons 1997.

References

1942 births
2002 deaths
Academics of Imperial College London
Alumni of Queen's University Belfast
Deaths from cancer in the United Kingdom
20th-century British mathematicians